The Pataliputra Inter-State Bus Terminal commonly known as Bairiya ISBT or Bairiya Bus Terminal Patna, located near Kumhrar in Patna is an Inter State Bus Terminal (ISBT) in Patna, Bihar, India.
It is the first ISBT of Bihar. The Patna ISBT was inaugurated on 18 September 2020. In 2022, BSRTC buses under Bihar State Road Transport Corporation running from Bankipur bus depot at Gandhi Maidan were shift to the new Patliputra inter-state bus terminal.

Location
Patliputra Inter-State Bus Terminal (Patliputra ISBT) is situated at Zero Mile (near Kumhrar) on Kumhrar-Masaurhi highway (SH-1).

Proposal for new ISBT
In 2022, Bihar Urban Infrastructure Development Corporation Limited (BUIDCO) was given the responsibility to select the consultant agency to prepare the detailed project report (DPR) for establishing a new-integrated bus terminus project at Kanhauli in Bihta.

See also
 New ISBT metro station

References

Transport in Patna 
Transport in Bihar 
Bus stations in India